The Kashag was the governing council of Tibet during the rule of the Qing dynasty and post-Qing period until the 1950s. It was created in 1721, and set by Qianlong Emperor in 1751 for the Ganden Phodrang in  the 13-Article Ordinance for the More Effective Governing of Tibet. In that year the Tibetan government was reorganized after the riots in Lhasa of the previous year. The civil administration was represented by Council (Kashag) after the post of Desi (or Regent; see: dual system of government) was abolished by the Qing imperial court. The Qing imperial court wanted the 7th Dalai Lama to hold both religious and administrative rule, while strengthening the position of the High Commissioners.

As specified by the 13-Article Ordinance for the More Effective Governing of Tibet, Kashag was composed of three temporal officials and one monk official. Each of them held the title of Kalön, sought appointment from the Qing imperial court, and the Qing imperial court issued certificates of appointment.

The function of the council was to decide government affairs collectively, and present opinions to the office of the first minister. The first minister then presented these opinions to the Dalai Lama and, during the Qing Dynasty the Amban, for a final decision. The privilege of presenting recommendations for appointing executive officials, governors and district commissioners gave the Council much power.

In August 1929, the Supreme Court of the Central Government stated that before the publication of new laws, laws in history regarding Tibet, regarding reincarnation of rinpoches, lamas were applicable

On 28 March 1959, Zhou Enlai, the premier of the People's Republic of China (PRC), formally announced the dissolution of the Kashag.

Ministries 

Headed by the council was the government administration, divided into ministries: political, military, economic, judicial, foreign, financial and educational departments. Except for the Ministry of Finance, all ministries had two representatives – one temporal and one monastic. The Ministry of Finance had three lay officials. Each of them held the title of Tsipön. All ministries had a right to make decisions to the extent of their competence. Matters, or problems outside the competence of ministries were (with a particular ministry's given opinion) presented to the council. Everything outside the competence of the council was presented to the Dalai Lama himself.

In Constitution of Tibet (10 March 1963 – 13 June 1991) 
On 29 April 1959, the 14th Dalai Lama re-established the Kashag. In 1963, the 14th Dalai Lama promulgated Constitution of Tibet, and he became Head of State of Kashag of Tibet, all ministers of Kashag were appointed by the Dalai Lama.

In the Charter of Tibetans in Exile (14 June 1991 – 14 March 2011) 
In 1974, the 14th Dalai Lama rejected calls for Tibetan independence. In 1991, the Charter of Tibetans in Exile was created, and the Dalai Lama became head of the Tibetan Administration and the executive functions for Tibetans-in-exile. Kashag was created and it consisted of Chief Kalon and seven Kalons.

In the Charter of Tibetans in Exile (29 May 2011 – present) 
In March 2011, at 71 years of age, he decided not to assume any political and administrative authority, the Charter of Tibetans in Exile was updated immediately in May 2011, with Kashag consisting of Sikyong and no more than seven Kalons.

According to Michael Backman, notable past members of the Cabinet include Gyalo Thondup, the Dalai Lama's eldest brother, who served as Chairman of the Cabinet and as Kalon of Security, and Jetsun Pema, the Dalai Lama's younger sister, who served variously as Kalon of Health and of Education. Article 12 of the 29-Article Ordinance for the More Effective Governing of Tibet states that relatives of the Dalai Lama or Panchen Lama must not hold government positions, or participate in political affairs.

 Penpa Tsering – Sikyong
 Dolma Gyari – Kalon for Home
 Dicki Chhoyang – Kalon for Information & International Relations
 Pema Chinnjor – Kalon for Religion & Culture
 Ngodup Drongchung – Kalon for Security
 Tsering Dhondup – Kalon for Finance
 Tsering Wangchuk – Kalon for Health

References

See also 

 Ganden Phodrang
 Chinese expedition to Tibet (1720)
 Tibet under Qing rule
 Dual system of government

Politics of Tibet
History of Tibet
1721 in Tibet